Project 56 may refer to:
 Project 56 (nuclear test), a series of nuclear safety tests
 Project 56 (album), a 2008 album by Deadmau5
 Kotlin-class destroyer